The Republic of Central Lithuania, commonly known as the Central Lithuania, and the Middle Lithuania, was an unrecognized short-lived puppet republic of Poland, that existed from 1920 to 1922. It was founded on 12 October 1920, after Żeligowski's Mutiny, when soldiers of the Polish Army, mainly the 1st Lithuanian–Belarusian Infantry Division under Lucjan Żeligowski, fully supported by the Polish air force, cavalry and artillery, attacked Lithuania. It was incorporated into Poland on 18 April 1922.

Centered around Vilnius, the historical capital of Lithuania, for 18 months the entity served as a buffer state between Poland, upon which it depended, and Lithuania, which claimed the area. The republic had some features of a state administration, but actually was an imitation of a sovereign state which repressed Lithuanian organizations, education, censored and suspended Lithuanian publications. This territory was a means of pressure on Lithuania as Poland tried to trade the Lithuanian capital to Lithuania in return for the dependence of re-emerged Lithuania (proposal of union between the two states) or surrender to Poland (proposal of autonomy for Lithuania within Polish borders). After a variety of delays, a disputed election took place on 8 January 1922, and the territory was annexed to Poland. Initially, the Polish government denied that it was responsible for the false flag action, but the Polish leader Józef Piłsudski subsequently acknowledged that he personally ordered Żeligowski to pretend that he was acting as a mutinous Polish officer.

The Polish–Lithuanian borders in the interwar period, while recognized by the Conference of Ambassadors of the Entente and the League of Nations, were not recognized by Kaunas-based Republic of Lithuania until the Polish ultimatum of 1938. In 1931 an international court in The Hague stated that the Polish seizure of the city had been a violation of international law, but there were no significant political repercussions.

History

Following the partitions of Poland, most of the lands that formerly constituted the Grand Duchy of Lithuania were annexed by the Russian Empire. The Imperial government increasingly pursued a policy of Russification of the newly acquired lands, which escalated after the failed January Uprising of 1864. The discrimination against local inhabitants included restrictions and outright bans on the usage of the Polish, Lithuanian (see Lithuanian press ban), Belarusian, and Ukrainian (see Valuyev circular) languages. These measures, however, had limited effects on the Polonisation effort undertaken by the Polish patriotic leadership of the Vilnius educational district. A similar effort was pursued during the 19th century Lithuanian National Revival, which sought to distance itself from both Polish and Russian influences.

The ethnic composition of the area has long been disputed, since censuses from that time and place are often considered unreliable. According to the first census of the Russian Empire in 1897, known to have been intentionally falsified, the population of the Vilna Governorate was distributed as follows: Belarusians at 56.1% (including Roman Catholics), Lithuanians at 17.6%, Jews at 12.7%, Poles at 8.2%, Russians at 4.9%, Germans at 0.2%, Ukrainians at 0.1%, Tatars at 0.1%, and 'Others' at 0.1% as well.

The 1916 German census of the Vilnius Region (published in 1919), however, reported strikingly different numbers. Poles at 58.0%, Lithuanians at 18.5%, Jews at 14.7%, Belarusians at 6.4%, Russians at 1.2%, and 'Other' at 1.2%.

Both censuses had encountered difficulties in the attempt to categorise their subjects. Ethnographers in the 1890s were often confronted with those who described themselves as both Lithuanians and Poles. According to a German census analyst, "Objectively determining conditions of nationality comes up against the greatest difficulties."

Aftermath of World War I
In the aftermath of the First World War, both Poland and Lithuania regained independence. The conflict between them soon arose as both Lithuania and Poland claimed Vilnius (known in Polish as Wilno) region.

Demographically, the main groups inhabiting Vilnius were Poles and Jews, with Lithuanians constituting a small fraction of the total population (2.0%–2.6%, according to the Russian census of 1897 and the German census of 1916). The Lithuanians nonetheless believed that their historical claim to Vilnius (former capital of the Grand Duchy of Lithuania) had precedence and refused to recognize any Polish claims to the city and the surrounding area.

While Poland under Józef Piłsudski attempted to create a Polish-led federation in the area that would include a number of ethnically non-Polish territories (Międzymorze), Lithuania strove to create a fully independent state that would include the Vilnius region. Two early 20th-century censuses indicated that Lithuanian speakers, whose language in the second half of the 19th century was suppressed by the Russian policies and had unfavourable conditions within the Catholic church, became a minority in the region. Based on this, Lithuanian authorities argued that the majority of inhabitants living there, even if they at the time did not speak Lithuanian, were thus Polonized (or Russified) Lithuanians.

Further complicating the situation, there were two Polish factions with quite different views on creation of the modern state in Poland. One party, led by Roman Dmowski, saw modern Poland as an ethnic state, another, led by Józef Piłsudski, wished to rebuild the Polish–Lithuanian Commonwealth. Both parties were determined to take the Poles of Vilnius into the new state. Piłsudski attempted to rebuild the Grand Duchy of Lithuania in a canton structure, as part of the Międzymorze federation:
Lithuania of Kaunas with Lithuanian language
Lithuania of Vilnius or Central Lithuania with Polish language
Lithuania of Minsk with Belarusian language

Eventually, Piłsudski's plan failed; it was opposed both by the Lithuanian government and by the Dmowski faction in Poland. Stanisław Grabski, representative of Dmowski's faction, was in charge of the Treaty of Riga negotiations with the Soviet Union, in which they rejected the Soviet offer of territories needed for the Minsk canton (Dmowski preferred Poland that would be smaller, but with higher percentage of ethnic Poles). The inclusion of territories predominant with non-Poles would have weakened support for Dmowski.

Polish–Lithuanian War

At the end of World War I, the area of the former Grand Duchy of Lithuania was divided between the Republic of Poland, the Belarusian People's Republic, and the Republic of Lithuania. Following the start of the Polish–Soviet War, during the next two years, the control of Vilnius and its environs changed frequently. In 1919 the territory was briefly occupied by the Red Army, which defeated the local self-defense units, but shortly afterwards the Russians were pushed back by the Polish Army. 1920 saw the Vilnius region occupied by the Red Army for the second time. However, when the Red Army was defeated in the Battle of Warsaw, the Soviets made the decision to hand the city back over to Lithuania. The Polish–Lithuanian War erupted when Lithuania and Poland clashed over the Suvalkai Region on August 26, 1920. The League of Nations intervened and arranged negotiations in Suwałki. The League negotiated a cease-fire, signed on October 7, 1920, placing the city of Vilnius in Lithuania. The Suwałki Agreement was to have taken effect at 12:00 on October 10, 1920.

The Lithuanian authorities entered Vilna in late August 1920. The Grinius cabinet rejected the proposal to hold a plebiscite to confirm the will of the region's inhabitants. His declaration was promptly accepted by the Seimas, for the percentage of Lithuanian population in Vilna was very small. On October 8, 1920, General Lucjan Żeligowski and the 1st Lithuanian-Belarusian Infantry Division numbering around 14,000 men, with local self-defense, launched the Żeligowski's Mutiny and engaged the Lithuanian 4th Infantry Regiment which promptly retreated. Upon the Polish advance, on October 8, the Lithuanian government left the city for Kaunas, and during withdrawal, meticulously destroyed telephone lines and rail between the two cities, which remained severed for a generation. Żeligowski entered Vilna on October 9, 1920, to enthusiastic cheers of the overwhelmingly Polish population of the city. The French and the British delegation decided to leave the matter in the hands of the League of Nations. On October 27, while the Żeligowski's campaign still continued outside Vilna, the League called for a popular referendum in the disputed area, which was again rejected by the Lithuanian representation. Poland disclaimed all responsibility for the action, maintaining that Żeligowski had acted entirely on his own initiative. This version of the event was redefined in August 1923 when Piłsudski, speaking in public at a Vilnius theater, stated that the attack was undertaken by his direct order. Żeligowski, a native to Lithuania, proclaimed a new bilingual state, the Republic of Central Lithuania (Litwa Środkowa). According to historian Jerzy J. Lerski, it was a "puppet state" which the Lithuanian Republic refused to recognize.

The seat of Lithuanian government moved to Lithuania's second-largest city, Kaunas. Armed conflicts between Kaunas and Central Lithuania continued for a few weeks, but neither side could gain a significant advantage. Due to the mediation efforts of the League of Nations, a new ceasefire was signed on November 21 and a truce six days later.

Founding of the Republic of Central Lithuania
On October 12, 1920, Żeligowski announced the creation of a provisional government. Soon the courts and the police were formed by his decree of January 7, 1921, and the civil rights of Central Lithuania were granted to all people who lived in the area on January 1, 1919, or for five years prior to August 1, 1914. The symbols of the state were a red flag with Polish White Eagle and Lithuanian Vytis. Its coat of arms was a mixture of Polish, Lithuanian and Vilnian symbols and resembled the Coat of arms of the Polish–Lithuanian Commonwealth.

Extensive diplomatic negotiations continued behind the scenes. Lithuania proposed creating a confederation of Baltic Western Lithuania (with Lithuanian as an official language) and Central Lithuania (with Polish as an official language). Poland added the condition that the new state must be also federated with Poland, pursuing Józef Piłsudski's goal of creating the Międzymorze Federation. Lithuanians rejected this condition. With nationalistic sentiments rising all over Europe, many Lithuanians were afraid that such a federation, resembling the Polish–Lithuanian Commonwealth from centuries ago, would be a threat to Lithuanian culture, as during the Commonwealth times many of the Lithuanian nobility was Polonized.

General elections in Central Lithuania were decreed to take place on January 9, 1921, and the regulations governing this election were to be issued prior to November 28, 1920. However, due to the League of Nations mediation, and the Lithuanian boycott of the voting, the elections were postponed.

Mediation

Peace talks were held under the auspice of the League of Nations. The initial agreement was signed by both sides on November 29, 1920, and the talks started on March 3, 1921. The League of Nations considered the Polish proposal of a plebiscite on the future of Central Lithuania. As a compromise, the so-called "Hymans' plan" was proposed (named after Paul Hymans). The plan consisted of 15 points, among them were:
Both sides guarantee each other's independence.
Central Lithuania is incorporated into the Federation of Lithuania, composed of two cantons: Lithuanian-inhabited Samogitia and multi-ethnic (Belarusian, Tatar, Polish, Jewish and Lithuanian) Vilnius area. Both cantons will have separate governments, parliaments, official languages and a common federative capital in Vilnius.
Lithuanian and Polish governments will create interstate commissions on both foreign affairs, trade and industry measures and local policies.
Poland and Lithuania will sign a defensive alliance treaty.
Poland will gain usage of ports in Lithuania.

The talks came to a halt when Poland demanded that a delegation from Central Lithuania (boycotted by Lithuania) be invited to Brussels. On the other hand, Lithuanians demanded that the troops in Central Lithuania be relocated behind the line drawn by the October 7, 1920 cease-fire agreement, while Hymans' proposal left Vilnius in Polish hands, which was unacceptable to Lithuania.

A new plan was presented to the governments of Lithuania and Poland in September 1921. It was basically a modification of "Hymans' plan", with the difference that the Klaipėda Region (the area in East Prussia north of the Neman River) was to be incorporated into Lithuania. However, both Poland and Lithuania openly criticized this revised plan and finally this turn of talks came to a halt as well.

Resolution

After the talks in Brussels failed, the tensions in the area grew. The most important issue was the huge army Central Lithuania fielded (27,000). General Lucjan Żeligowski decided to pass the power to the civil authorities and confirmed the date of the elections (January 8, 1922). There was a significant electioneering propaganda campaign as Poles tried to win the support of other ethnic groups present in the area. The Polish government was also accused of various strong-arm policies (like the closing of Lithuanian newspapers or election violations like not asking for a valid document from a voter). The elections were boycotted by Lithuanians, most of the Jews and some Belarusians. Poles were the only major ethnic group out of which the majority of people voted.

The elections were not recognized by Lithuania. Polish factions, which gained control over the parliament (Sejm) of the Republic (the Sejm of Central Lithuania), on February 20 passed the request of incorporation into Poland. The request was accepted by the Polish Sejm on March 22, 1922.

All of the Republic's territory was eventually incorporated into the newly formed Wilno Voivodeship. Lithuania declined to accept the Polish authority over the area. Instead, it continued to treat the so-called Vilnius Region as part of its own territory and the city itself as its constitutional capital, with Kaunas being only a temporary seat of government. The dispute over the Vilnius region resulted in much tensions in the Polish–Lithuanian relations in the interwar period.

Aftermath
Alfred Erich Senn noted that if Poland had not prevailed in the Polish–Soviet War, Lithuania would have been invaded by the Soviets, and would never have experienced two decades of independence. Despite the Soviet–Lithuanian Peace Treaty of 1920, Lithuania was very close to being invaded by the Soviets in summer 1920 and being forcibly incorporated into that state, and only the Polish victory derailed this plan.

After the Molotov–Ribbentrop Pact and the Soviet invasion of Poland in 1939, Vilnius and its surroundings of up to 30 kilometres were given to Lithuania in accordance with the Soviet–Lithuanian Mutual Assistance Treaty of October 10, 1939, and Vilnius again became the capital of Lithuania. However, in 1940, Lithuania was annexed by the Soviet Union, forcing the country to become the Lithuanian SSR. Since the restoration of Lithuanian independence in 1991, the city's status as Lithuania's capital has been internationally recognized.

See also
 Army of Central Lithuania 
 History of Vilnius
 Vilnius Voivodeship
 Polish National-Territorial Region
 The 1922 Republic of Central Lithuania general election
 List of sovereign states in 1922

References

External links
 Lithuanian-Belarusian language boundary in the 4th decade of the 19th century
 Lithuanian-Belarusian language boundary in the beginning of the 20th century
 State symbols of Central Lithuania
 Repatriation and resettlement of Ethnic Poles
 From "Russian" to "Polish": Vilnius-Wilno 1900–1925
  Kampf um Wilna – historische Rechte und demographische Argumente
 Mixed ethnic groups around Wilno / Vilnius during inter-war period, after Norman Davies, God's Playground: A History of Poland: Volume II, 1795 to the Present; Columbia University Press: 1982.
 Stamps of ROC
  A. Srebrakowski, Sejm Wileński 1922 roku. Idea i jej realizacja, Wrocław 1993
  A. Srebrakowski, Stosunek mniejszości narodowych Litwy Środkowej wobec wyborów do Sejmu Wileńskiego
  A. Srebrakowski, Konflik polsko_litewski na tle wydarzeń roku 1920 

 
Historical regions in Lithuania
Former countries in Europe
1920s in Lithuania
Post–Russian Empire states
Lithuania–Poland relations
States and territories established in 1920
States and territories disestablished in 1922
1920 establishments in Europe
1920 establishments in Belarus
1920 establishments in Lithuania
1920 establishments in Poland
1922 disestablishments in Europe
1922 disestablishments in Belarus
1922 disestablishments in Lithuania
1922 disestablishments in Poland
Former countries of the interwar period